Clube do Bilene, is a football (soccer) club based in Praia do Bilene, Mozambique. It plays in the Provincial Championship of Gaza.

References

Football clubs in Mozambique